The Parish Church of St Mary, Radcliffe is a church in Radcliffe, Greater Manchester. It was built during the 14th century, but the tower was not added until the 15th century. The building is designated Grade I  by English Heritage, having been listed in 1966 under its former name of the Church of St Mary and St Bartholomew. In 1991, some local parishes were merged, and the church adopted its present name.

The churchyard contains the war graves of six soldiers of World War I and three of World War II.

Conservation
The church roof was restored in 2008–09, at a cost of £250,000.

On Boxing Day 2015 the church was inundated by flood waters so badly that the church was unapproachable until the Monday 28 December. The flooding caused thousands of pounds worth of damage, including damage to many cherished artefacts.

See also

 List of churches in Greater Manchester
 Grade I listed churches in Greater Manchester
 Listed buildings in Radcliffe, Greater Manchester

References

External links
 Parish website
 A Church Near You entry

Grade I listed churches in Greater Manchester
Church of England church buildings in Greater Manchester
Anglican Diocese of Manchester
Saint Mary